The Professional Bowls Association is an international organisation which promotes bowls worldwide and organises competitions, including the World Indoor Bowls Championships with other Bowls Associations. It also operates as the world governing body for Bowls.

History

Beginnings
In 1990 the sport was under a period of fragmentation following the loss of the television coverage connected with the World Indoor Championships. John Hall the President of the English Bowls Association unsuccessfully called for closer co-operation between the indoor and outdoor game. In addition there were 20 national associations and authorities, a crown Green Association and short mat rules. In 1992, a player led organisation formed the Professional Bowls Association (PBA), during the 1992 World Indoor Bowls Championship, which were held in the Preston Guildhall to promote Bowls worldwide and on television.

Formation of the WBT
On 1 January 1997, under the then chairman Richard Corsie, the PBA created the World Bowls Tour and after the 1997 championship replaced the World Indoor Bowls Council as the leading indoor organisation. The purpose of the World Bowls Tour was to set up and create championships and competitions to further the aims of the PBA.

Organisational structure

Branches and location
The PBA has branches across the world, within Europe, in the UK (where the organisation was set up). It also has branches including in the United States, Australia, New Zealand, Canada, Israel, South Africa and Hong Kong.

The PBA Committee
The PBA Committee is the main organ of the Professional Bowls Association.

References

Bowls
International sports organizations
Bowling organizations